Marisa Casanueva Cabrero (born 4 February 1981) is a Spanish long distance runner. She competed in the women's marathon at the 2017 World Championships in Athletics.

References

External links
 

1981 births
Living people
Spanish female long-distance runners
Spanish female marathon runners
World Athletics Championships athletes for Spain
Place of birth missing (living people)
20th-century Spanish women
21st-century Spanish women